The Pocock Baronetcy, of Hart in the County Palatine of Durham and of Twickenham in the County of Middlesex, was a title in the Baronetage of the United Kingdom. It was created on 18 August 1821 for George Pocock, Member of Parliament for Bridgwater. He was the son of Vice Admiral Sir George Pocock. The title became extinct on the death of the fourth Baronet in 1921.

Pocock baronets, of Hart and Twickenham (1821)
Sir George Pocock, 1st Baronet (1765–1840)
Sir George Edward Pocock, 2nd Baronet (1792–1866)
Sir George Francis Coventry Pocock, 3rd Baronet (1830–1915)
Sir Charles Guy Coventry Pocock, 4th Baronet (1863–1921)

References

Extinct baronetcies in the Baronetage of the United Kingdom
History of the London Borough of Richmond upon Thames
1821 establishments in England
1921 disestablishments in England